The Jacaboa River is a river of Patillas, Puerto Rico.

See also
List of rivers of Puerto Rico

References

External links
 USGS Hydrologic Unit Map – Caribbean Region (1974)
Rios de Puerto Rico

Rivers of Puerto Rico